"Innocent Love" is a 1986 synthpop song performed by German singer Sandra. It was written by Hubert Kemmler, Ulrich Herter, Susanne Müller, and Klaus Hirschburger, and produced by Michael Cretu and Armand Volker. The song was released as the first single from Sandra's second solo album, Mirrors. The single was commercially successful, reaching the top 10 in Norway and France, and the top 20 in Germany and Switzerland.

The music video for the song was directed by DoRo (Rudi Dolezal and Hannes Rossacher). The clip was released on Sandra's VHS video compilations Ten on One (The Singles) and 18 Greatest Hits, released in 1987 and 1992, respectively, as well as the 2003 DVD The Complete History.

A new remix of the song was included on Sandra's 2006 retrospective Reflections.

Formats and track listings
 7" single
A. "Innocent Love" – 3:50
B. "Innocent Theme" – 3:26

 12" single
A. "Innocent Love" (Extended) – 6:47
B. "Innocent Theme" – 3:26

Charts

Weekly charts

Year-end charts

References

External links
 "Innocent Love" at Discogs
 The official Sandra YouTube channel

1986 singles
1986 songs
Sandra (singer) songs
Song recordings produced by Michael Cretu
Songs written by Hubert Kemmler
Songs written by Klaus Hirschburger
Virgin Records singles